Antonio Napolitano may refer to:

 Antonio Napolitano (film critic) (1928–2014), Italian film critic
 Antonio Napolitano (footballer) (born 1999), Argentine footballer

See also
 Antonio Napoletano (1937–2019), Italian Roman Catholic bishop